Pictures in the Sky is the second solo album by songwriter Rich Mullins and was released in 1987 on Reunion Records.

The single "Screen Door" became a concert favorite. Mullins wrote the song in Chattanooga on a trip to Knoxville, originally intending it to write a limerick. When performing "Screen Door" in concert, Mullins and his band would sing the lyrics and create the song's unique rhythm by hitting plastic cups on a table in a synchronized pattern.

Track listing

Side one
 "When You Love" (Rich Mullins) – 3:25
 "It Don't Do" (Rich Mullins, Steve Cudworth) – 3:37
Appeared on compilation Here in America 2003
 "Verge of a Miracle" (Rich Mullins) – 4:02
Appeared on compilation Songs 1996
 "Pictures In The Sky" (Rich Mullins) – 3:53
 "Be With You" (Rich Mullins, Justin Peters) – 2:50
Appeared on compilation Songs 2 1999

Side two
 "Screen Door" (Rich Mullins) – 1:23
Full-length radio version appeared on compilation Songs 1996
 "What Trouble are Giants" (Rich Mullins) – 3:54
 "Steal at Any Price" (Rich Mullins, Wayne Kirkpatrick) – 4:15
 "Could be a Celebration" (Rich Mullins, Gary Jones, Renee Garcia, Reed Arvin, Lang Bliss) – 3:25
 "Love That Knows No Bounds" (Rich Mullins, Wayne Kirkpatrick, Cathy Snyder) – 3:35

Charts

Radio singles

Personnel 

 Rich Mullins – lead vocals
 Reed Arvin – keyboards (1–5, 7–10), synthesizers (1, 5, 7–10), footsteps (6), finger snaps (6), handclaps (6)
 Jerry McPherson – guitars (1–4, 8, 9, 10), bouzouki (7)
 Gary Lunn – bass (2, 3, 4, 9)
 Dave Adams – additional drum programming 
 Keith Edwards – drums (2, 3, 4)
 Tim Marsh – percussion (2, 3, 4, 8)
 Chris Harris – backing vocals (1, 3, 6, 9)
 Mark Heimermann – backing vocals (1, 3, 4, 7, 9)
 Chris Rodriguez – backing vocals (1, 3, 4, 6, 7, 9)
 Lisa Bevill – backing vocals (2)
 Kim Fleming – backing vocals (2)
 Donna McElroy – backing vocals (2)
 Wayne Kirkpatrick – backing vocals (4, 6, 7)
 Reneé Garcia – backing vocals (9)

Production 

 Reed Arvin – producer
 Michael Blanton – executive producer
 Dan Harrell – executive producer
 Center Stage (Nashville, Tennessee) – recording studio
 Hummingbird Studios (Nashville, Tennessee) – recording studio
 The Gold Mine (Brentwood, Tennessee) – recording studio
 Brent King  – engineer, mixing
 Hank Williams – mastering at MasterMix (Nashville, Tennessee)
 Buddy Jackson – art direction, design
 Mark Tucker – photography

References 

Rich Mullins albums
1987 albums
Albums produced by Reed Arvin